Țepu is a commune in Galați County, Western Moldavia, Romania with a population of 2,518 people. It is composed of two villages, Țepu and Țepu de Sus.

Natives
Tudor Pamfile

References

Communes in Galați County
Localities in Western Moldavia